Athabasca Healthcare Centre is a medical facility located in Athabasca, Alberta.

Alberta Health Services is responsible for the operations of the hospital. The hospital contains 27 acute care beds and 23 continuing care beds.

Services
Emergency
Diagnostic imaging 
Inpatient medical care
Laboratory
Palliative care
Physical therapy

References 

Hospitals in Alberta
Athabasca, Alberta